Niederentzen is a commune in the Haut-Rhin department in Grand Est in north-eastern France.

Geography
The village of Niederentzen was established between the Vosges and the Rhine on the left bank of the Ill, at an altitude of 205 meters. It has an area of 8.81 square kilometres. The local climate is characterized by weak precipitation, 539 mm per annum on average, and an average annual temperature of 10.2 °C.

History
In this area a place called "Giessen" was discovered, along with tombs, jewels and ceramics dating from the first period of the Iron Age to the end of the Bronze Age.

The name (Nidern Enszheim 1276) is a contraction of "Nieder-Ensisheim" ("Nieder": lower). Niederentzen and Oberentzen were originally a single holding. In the thirteenth century, this holding was dissociated and Niederentzen became part of the territory of Murbach Abbey. In 1358, the village was taken by the Habsburgs, who gave it first to the lords of Hattstatt, and then, on their extinction (1585), to the Swiss noble family of Truchsess von Rheinfelden. Jean-Melchior Truchsess von Rheinfelden, who died in 1699, returned the property to the church. After the French Revolution, Niederentzen became part of Ensisheim.

During the nineteenth century, the American businessman Henri Castro offered lands in the state of Texas. Some inhabitants of Niederentzen responded and settled in Castroville and D'Hanis. This second city is currently twinned with Niederentzen; a portion of the village bears its name.

Coat of arms

The coat of arms of the village of Niederentzen was created in 1978 by M. Lucien Bilger, then mayor of the commune. It combines elements of the armorial bearings of the Hattstatt lords and the Truchsess nobles, illustrating the history of the village.

Administration

Demographics

See also
 Communes of the Haut-Rhin department

References

External links

 Town's official site (French)

Communes of Haut-Rhin